Spacetalk is an Australian technology company.

The company changed its name from MGM Wireless to Spacetalk Ltd on 12 November 2020, to reflect its primary focus, which is to develop and commercialise innovative wearable devices.

The company's education division provides school-to-home communication for absence management, news and emergencies using  SMS, apps and cloud based technology.

The company is headquartered in Adelaide, South Australia.

History 
MGM Wireless was founded in 2001 by Mark Fortunatow, Greg Sincock and Mark Hurd, who lent their initials to the name of the company.

Following coverage by local and international media in late 2003, their messageyou service became part of a state government solution to solving truancy in South Australia. During 2004 and 2005, MGM Wireless services were made available nationally. In 2005, MGM Wireless began to roll out services internationally, with trials in New Zealand. In 2006, trials began in the United States city of Tucson, Arizona. In 2007, further trials began in the Indian city Ahmedabad, the capital of Gujurat. In 2010, MGM Wireless won preferred supplier for 400 schools in New Zealand. In 2011, MGM Wireless expanded into the childcare market across Australia and in New Zealand.

In September 2017, MGM Wireless launched its Spacetalk brand of family location and child safety wearable devices. The Spacetalk watch is a combination of mobile phone and watch which allows parents to locate their children using mobile phone bandwidth devices. The device features no open access to the Internet, social media and apps. Since launching the Spacetalk watch, it has won an Australian good design award and is now available via the Qantas store, and over 800 leading retailers in Australia and New Zealand. MGM officially launched the product in the UK market in May 2019

Corporate affairs

Shareholder Association 
In August 2021 the Spacetalk Shareholders Group (SSG) was formed by several generally non-associated Spacetalk shareholders.
The SSG members work to share common concerns about the impacts of adverse governance and management of Spacetalk and are working to engage the company to improve the company for all co-owners.

Board of directors 
The company is run by a board of directors made up of most company outsiders, as is customary for publicly traded companies. Members of the board as of July 2022 are Georg Chmiel, Mark Fortunatow, Martin Pretty, Dr Bradon Gien, Sauragb Jain, Mike Rann.

Financial

Controversies 
On July 25, 2021, it was reported that the former global sales directory Ian Hume would be taking legal action in the Federal Court against Spacetalk. Hume was allegedly fired via text message after repeatedly warning the company about its stock issues and that it was losing the trust of its business partners because it could not provide product. Spacetalk has not commented on the allegations and legal action remains pending 

On July 5, 2022, Spacetalk was served with a Section 249D Notice with a request by Merewether Capital Management Pty Ltd as Manager of Merewether Capital Inception Fund, Harry Basle, Ian Cameron, Lindsay Cardno, Mitchell Cardno, Peter Cossetto & Annamaria Cossetto ATF Cossetto Family Superannuation Fund, Coz-E Pty Ltd ATF Cossetto Family Trust, Mark Gately, Savvas Ioannou & Maria Ioannou, Matthew Payne, Lasse Petersen and Lasse Petersen ATF the Icebear Trust and Neil Page being shareholders claiming to hold at least 5% of the shares in the company to call for a general meeting and proposed a resolution for the removal of three directors of the company: Mark Fortunatow, Georg Chmiel and Michael Rann

On October 10, 2022, Spacetalk terminated the employment contract of Mark Fortunatow, chief executive officer and managing director. The Spacetalk board appointment Saurabh Jain as the Acting Chief Executive Officer while the search for a new chief executive officer was underway.

On November 10, 2022, Spacetalk released a leadership update to advise that further to its announcement of 7 October 2022, the Spacetalk Board exercised its rights to make the termination of Mark Fortunatow effective immediately and without payment of the balance of his notice period.

References 

Information technology companies of Australia
Technology companies of New Zealand